Mordellistena pseudohumeralis is a species of beetle in the genus Mordellistena of the family Mordellidae. It was described by Nakane in 1956.

References

Beetles described in 1956
pseudohumeralis